The National Museum of the Union is a history and archaeology museum in Alba-Iulia, Romania.

History 
The museum was inaugurated in 1888 upon the initiative of the Historical, Archaeological and Natural Sciences Society of the Lower Alba County, having the famous archaeologist Adalbert Cserni as headmaster.

In 1929, under the aegis of the ASTRA Association, it was organized as the Museum of the Union. Valuable artefacts further enriched the rich archaeological collections and a new collection of items belonging to the modern history of the Romanians was added. In 1938, under the lead of the historian Ion Berciu, the settlement came to be managed by the Romanian state under the new name of Alba Regional Museum.

In 1968, it underwent an ample reorganization, returning to its former name.

Buildings 
The "Babylon" building is a historic monument built between 1851 and 1853, bearing influences of Romantic architecture.
It was used as a residence pavilion for officers, and between 1967 and 1968, it was refurbished to become a museum.

The "Union Hall" (Sala Unirii) was built between 1898 and 1900. It is the building where the Great National Assembly of Alba Iulia voted the Union of Transylvania with Romania.

Both buildings of the museum are listed as historic monuments.

Collections 
It is worth mentioning bronze deposits of Cugir, Ighiel, Zlatna and Vintu de Jos, as well as the pottery, the zoomorphic idols and the iron, bronze and stone tools, discovered in the fortified great settlement of Teleac. Especially interesting are the marble statuette depicting Liber Pater, the bronze collection, the glass collection, bone, horn and ivory objects as well as the monetary hoards from Alba Iulia, Tibru, Geomal, Șpring and Medves. These include the silver hoard from Lupu and the materials discovered in the Princely tomb of Cugir. The numismatic collection includes ancient, medieval and modern coins, plaques and coins.

The modern history collection contains documents, photographs, memorial objects from the Revolution of 1848 and the Union of the 1 December 1918 of Transylvania with Romania.

The museum owns goods listed in the Romanian National Cultural Heritage Treasure.

Gallery

See also 
 Apulum

Notes

References

External links 

 Official Website 
 National Museum of the Union at Romanian Institute for Cultural Memory (cIMeC)

Archaeological museums in Romania
History museums in Romania
Museums of Dacia
Museums established in 1888
Museums in Alba County